Local elections were held in San Miguel, Bulacan on May 13, 2019 within the Philippine general election. The voters will elect candidates for the elective local posts in the municipality: the mayor, vice mayor, and eight councilors.

Background

Incumbent Mayor Marivee "Ivy" M. Coronel is running for reelection as Mayor under the National Unity Party (Philippines). Her opponent are Jiboy Cabochan, 2007 Mayoralty aspirant he is running under the Partido Demokratiko Pilipino-Lakas ng Bayan and former mayor Roderick DG. Tiongson running under the United Nationalist Alliance.

Results

Mayor

Vice Mayor

Sangguniang Bayan

|-bgcolor=black
|colspan=25|

References

 
 

2019 Philippine local elections
Elections in San Miguel, Bulacan
May 2019 events in the Philippines
2019 elections in Central Luzon